Elections to Ballymoney Borough Council were held on 7 June 2001 on the same day as the other Northern Irish local government elections. The election used three district electoral areas to elect a total of 16 councillors.

Election results

Note: "Votes" are the first preference votes.

Districts summary

|- class="unsortable" align="centre"
!rowspan=2 align="left"|Ward
! % 
!Cllrs
! % 
!Cllrs
! %
!Cllrs
! %
!Cllrs
! % 
!Cllrs
!rowspan=2|TotalCllrs
|- class="unsortable" align="center"
!colspan=2 bgcolor="" | DUP
!colspan=2 bgcolor="" | UUP
!colspan=2 bgcolor="" | SDLP
!colspan=2 bgcolor="" | Sinn Féin
!colspan=2 bgcolor="white"| Others
|-
|align="left"|Ballymoney Town
|bgcolor="#D46A4C"|44.2
|bgcolor="#D46A4C"|3
|26.9
|2
|12.3
|0
|0.0
|0
|16.6
|0
|5
|-
|align="left"|Bann Valley
|bgcolor="#D46A4C"|39.7
|bgcolor="#D46A4C"|3
|18.6
|1
|20.2
|1
|21.5
|1
|0.0
|0
|6
|-
|align="left"|Bushvale
|bgcolor="#D46A4C"|44.0
|bgcolor="#D46A4C"|2
|27.8
|2
|19.4
|1
|8.8
|0
|0.0
|0
|5
|-'
|-
|- class="unsortable" class="sortbottom" style="background:#C9C9C9"
|align="left"| Total
|42.3
|8
|23.7
|5
|17.6
|2
|11.5
|1
|4.9
|0
|16
|-
|}

Districts results

Ballymoney Town

1997: 2 x Independent, 2 x DUP, 1 x UUP
2001: 3 x DUP, 2 x UUP
1997-2001 Change: DUP and UUP gain from Independent (two seats)

Bann Valley

1997: 2 x DUP, 2 x UUP, 1 x SDLP, 1 x Sinn Féin
2001: 3 x DUP, 1 x Sinn Féin, 1 x SDLP, 1 x UUP
1997-2001 Change: DUP gain from UUP

Bushvale

1997: 2 x DUP, 2 x SDLP, 1 x UUP
2001: 2 x DUP, 2 x UUP, 1 x SDLP
1997-2001 Change: UUP gain from SDLP

References

Ballymoney Borough Council elections
Ballymoney